A Million Bid  is a 1927 silent drama film directed by Michael Curtiz and starring Dolores Costello. It is based on the 1908 play, Agnes, by Gladys Rankin Drew writing under the pseudonym "George Cameron".

The story was previously filmed in 1914 under the same name.

Cast
 Dolores Costello as Dorothy Gordon
 Warner Oland as Geoffrey Marsh
 Malcolm McGregor as Dr. Robert Brent
 Betty Blythe as Mrs. Gordon
 William Demarest as George Lamont
 Douglas Gerrard as Lord Bobby Vane
 Grace Gordon as Maid to the Gordons

Preservation status
An incomplete print of this film, with Italian intertitles, is housed at the Library of Congress.

References

External links

 

page devoted to the film(with lobby cards)

1927 films
Films directed by Michael Curtiz
1927 drama films
American black-and-white films
American silent feature films
Warner Bros. films
Silent American drama films
American films based on plays
1920s English-language films
1920s American films